The Wanton of Spain is a 1969 Spanish drama film directed by César Fernández Ardavín. The film was selected as the Spanish entry for the Best Foreign Language Film at the 42nd Academy Awards, but was not accepted as a nominee. It was also entered into the 6th Moscow International Film Festival.

Cast
 Julián Mateos as Calisto
 Elisa Ramírez as Melibea
 Amelia de la Torre as Celestina
 Hugo Blanco
 Gonzalo Cañas
 Heidelotte Diehl as Areúsa
 Eva Guerr as Lucrecia
 Eva Lissa as Alisa
 Antonio Mancho
 Antonio Medina
 Ursula Mellin as Elicia (as Uschi Mellin)
 Konrad Wagner as Pleberio

See also
 List of submissions to the 42nd Academy Awards for Best Foreign Language Film
 List of Spanish submissions for the Academy Award for Best Foreign Language Film

References

External links
 

1969 films
1960s Spanish-language films
Spanish drama films
1969 drama films
Films directed by César Fernández Ardavín
1960s Spanish films